Matías Leonel Grandi (born 24 November 1998) is an Argentine professional footballer who plays as a forward for Almirante Brown.

Career
Grandi started out at senior level with Almirante Brown, having joined their youth set-up in 2016 from Almagro. His first appearance came in a home loss to Estudiantes on 27 January 2019, replacing Leandro Guzmán after sixty-six minutes in Primera B Metropolitana under Blas Giunta.

Career statistics
.

References

External links

1998 births
Living people
Place of birth missing (living people)
Argentine footballers
Association football forwards
Primera B Metropolitana players
Club Almirante Brown footballers